Mute is a compilation album released in 2000 on Hush Records. The disc of instrumental music is a sampler of the label's roster.

Track listing
 "Gypsymothcaravan", performed by The Sensualists – 4:07
 "Nova", performed by Tracker – 2:49
 "Centralia", performed by Norfolk & Western – 5:09
 "Make Out Music for the Emotionally Impaired", performed by Beltline – 3:20
 "Ceiling Fan [Remix]", performed by  Kaitlyn Ni Donovan  – 5:55
 "Concerto in Zed Minor for Shoestring Orchestra", performed by Brother Egg – 3:30
 "Wistful", performed by Boy Crazy – 1:57
 "Left-handed", performed by Chad Crouch – 3:18
 "Endure", performed by Peter Miser – 4:11
 "Parisienne [Dub Version]", performed by Rice Cream – 3:47
 "Edinburgh", performed by Ovian – 5:15
 "Close Yet Far", performed by King Pang – 3:32
 "Playground", performed by E Vax – 4:12
 "Teenage Qix", performed by Bossa Nova 2600 – 2:56
 "Microhome", performed by Wow & Flutter – 6:33
 "Later On", performed by Jeff London – 3:05
 "New York City", performed by Corrina Repp – 4:26
 "End of Amnesia", performed by Matt Ward – 2:07

Record label compilation albums
2000 compilation albums
Hush Records albums